Vermont Commons: Voices of Independence is a newspaper in Vermont that advocates the secession of Vermont from the United States. At its height in 2011 it has 12,000 subscribers, but has since canceled distribution of the paper version. It was first published in 2005.

References 

Defunct newspapers published in Vermont
Publications established in 2005
2005 establishments in Vermont
Year of disestablishment missing